Way Out Yonder may refer to:
Way Out Yonder (Andy Irvine album), a 2000 album by Irish folk musician Andy Irvine.
Way Out Yonder, a 2005 album by Sons of the San Joaquin.